The Port of Indiana-Burns Harbor is an industrial area, founded in 1965 and located on the Lake Michigan shore of Indiana at the intersection of U.S. Route 12 and Indiana State Road 249.  The primary work done in the area is the manufacturing of steel, and the port area is dominated by steel mills.  The port is divided between the municipalities of Burns Harbor and Portage.

Construction of the Port of Indiana-Burns Harbor was extremely controversial, with conservationists fighting to preserve a segment of the Indiana Dunes that occupied the site of the future port.  The port and its steel mills were constructed on top of what was once the Central Dunes region of the Indiana Dunes and site of some of the hanggliding experiments carried out by a crew led by pioneer aviator Octave Chanute.

Authorization of the Indiana Dunes National Park, which borders the Port of Indiana-Burns Harbor on three sides, was part of a political compromise that also involved the construction of the port.

Port economy
The Port of Indiana-Burns Harbor, as of 2015, is dominated by three extensive industrial plants:
 Gary Works-Midwest Plant, a unit of the U.S. Steel Corporation.
 The Burns Harbor steel works of Cleveland-Cliffs (formerly ArcelorMittal), originally constructed by the former Bethlehem Steel Corporation.
 The Northern Indiana Public Service Bailly generating station owned by NiSource.

Port history
When Bethlehem Steel and advocates for preservation of the Central Dunes crossed swords in Congress in the early 1960s, the steel company won.  Two key arguments used by Bethlehem in their successful campaign were increased national security from the production of American steel, and the creation of well-paid jobs in a field that was then dominated by the United Steelworkers union. Two arguments advanced by the people opposed to the project were that the mill could have easily been located directly east of Gary, in a less sensitive and strategic ecological zone, and that large infrastructure projects, which would amount to a tax subsidy, were needed to construct a mill in this area.

Making steel in the Burns Harbor area required support from the federal government because of the shallow waters of Lake Michigan offshore from the sand dunes.  In order to make it possible for lake freighters to bring iron ore, coal, and limestone to the steel mills, extensive dredging and engineering work was necessary. This work linked the Little Calumet River to Lake Michigan via Burns Ditch.

Congress, as part of the River and Harbor Act of 1965, instructed the Army Corps of Engineers to carry out the necessary work to create and maintain the artificial harbor that would become the Port of Indiana.  In line with overall Great Lakes standards, the docking areas are dredged to a depth of at least 27 feet (8 m).  The port is protected by 8,230 feet (2,510 m) of steel and rubblemound breakwaters.

In addition to the federal help, the state of Indiana showed its support for the Port of Indiana project by constructing two roads, Indiana 149 and Indiana 249, to serve the new industrial area.

Port recreational use
The Port of Indiana-Burns Harbor also contains the Burns Waterway Small Boat Harbor, a -long canal, dredged to a depth of 6 feet (1.8 m), extending inland from Lake Michigan to south of U.S. Highway 12. This boat harbor provides access to the inland Portage Marina and Marina Shores, a private, 300-boat marina/condominium complex under development as of 2011. The marina is successful, but the housing development failed in the early stages of development.

Other than the small boat harbor, much of the Port of Indiana-Burns Harbor is a "restricted area" as of 2019, and the public is not admitted within most of the port area.

Port incidents
The joint use of the Port of Indiana for industrial and recreational purposes has led to incidents.  In August 2019, ArcelorMittal inadvertently vented elevated levels of ammonia and cyanide from a Burns Harbor blast furnace into the Little Calumet River.  Hundreds of fish were killed.  Elements of the Port of Indiana public infrastructure, including the river and adjacent boardwalk, were temporarily closed to the public.  In February 2022, Cleveland-Cliffs (which had acquired the mill from ArcelorMittal) agreed to a $3 million settlement based on the incident.

References

External links
 Link to National Park Service map of the Port of Indiana
 U.S. Army Corps of Engineers
 Port of Indiana–Burns Harbor

Indiana
Geography of Porter County, Indiana
Indiana populated places on Lake Michigan
Transportation in Porter County, Indiana